Ch'iyar Qullu (Aymara ch'iyara black, qullu mountain, "black mountain", also spelled Chiar Kkollu) is a  mountain in the Cordillera Real in the Andes of Bolivia. It is situated in the La Paz Department, Sud Yungas Province, Irupana Municipality. Ch'iyar Qullu lies south of the mountain Pupusani, north-west of Illimani and south-east of P'iq'iñ Q'ara.

References 

Mountains of La Paz Department (Bolivia)